Lynnfield High School is a four-year, coeducational public high school for students in grade nine through twelve residing in the town of Lynnfield, Massachusetts, United States.

Athletics 
Lynnfield High School is a member of the Cape Ann League and is a Division III competitor in the Massachusetts Interscholastic Athletic Association. Sports teams are known as the Pioneers, and school colors are blue and gold. Lynnfield High offers sports in the fall, winter, and spring seasons.

Fall Sports
Football
Golf
Soccer (Boys)
Soccer (Girls)
Field Hockey
Volleyball
Cross Country (Boys)
Cross Country (Girls)
Cheerleading
Winter Sports
Basketball (Boys)
Basketball (Girls)
Ice Hockey (Boys)
Ice Hockey (Girls)
Wrestling
Indoor Track (Boys)
Indoor Track (Girls)
Gymnastics
Swimming (Co-Ed)
Spring Sports
Baseball
Softball
Tennis (Boys)
Tennis (Girls)
Track & Field (Boys)
Track & Field (Girls)
Lacrosse (Boys)
Lacrosse (Girls)

Arts and activities 
Lynnfield High School has many notable art and music programs, as well as clubs and extracurricular activities. Every fall, a Club Fair is held during school, organized by student representatives from different activities to inform and encourage freshmen to participate and get involved. Some of Lynnfield's clubs and activities include:

 Best Buddies
 Math Team
 Mock Trial
 The Catalyst (Student Newspaper)
 Dance Club
 Debate Team
 Habitat for Humanity
 Concert Choir
 Men's Chorus and Women's Chorus
 Chamber Singers (Advanced Choral Ensemble)
 Sweet Treble (Student-led Female Acapella Group)
 Harmageddon (Occasionally running Student-led Male Acapella Group)
 Theatre East

Theatre East is Lynnfield High School's drama company. The company performs a 40-minute play each winter as a long-time participant of the METG (Massachusetts Educational Theater Guild)'s High School division Dramafest. It has competed against numerous high schools in the local area, and the company is renowned for its consistently impressive productions and winning awards each year at every level of competition. In 2019, Theatre East went to the Finals level of competition with their production of Donald Margulies' Shipwrecked! An Entertainment.

Graduation requirements 
In order to graduate from Lynnfield High School, students must earn 108 credits and meet the following departmental and community service requirements:

Students must be scheduled for a minimum of 27.5 credits (or the equivalent) per school year. At least one semester elective is required of all students.

Notable alumni

 Scott Curtis,  former American football linebacker who played in the National Football League
 Dennis Kenney, American actor, singer, and dancer
 Richard Tisei, American politician and realtor
 Bob Tufts, American professional baseball player who was a pitcher in Major League Baseball (MLB)
Danielle DiLorenzo Nath, Two-time Survivor contestant (Panama, Heroes vs Villains).

References

Cape Ann League
Buildings and structures in Lynnfield, Massachusetts
Public high schools in Massachusetts
Schools in Essex County, Massachusetts